Legal Eagles (Chinese: 法网天后) is a Singaporean drama produced by Mediacorp Studios Malaysia and telecast on Mediacorp Channel 8. The show aired at 9pm on weekdays and had a repeat telecast at 8am the following day. The series consists of 30 episodes. It stars Felicia Chin and Zhang Zhenhuan as the casts of this series.

Cast

Michelle & Edward Lawyer

Jian (Junhao) family

Wen (Shuren) family

Other Cast

Development 

Production began in March 2016 and wrap up its filming in June 2016.

See also 
 List of MediaCorp Channel 8 Chinese drama series (2010s)

References 

2017 Singaporean television series debuts
2017 Singaporean television series endings
Channel 8 (Singapore) original programming